Merry Men: The Real Yoruba Demons is a 2018 Nigerian action comedy film written by Anthony Kehinde Joseph, produced by Darlington Abuda and directed by Toka Mcbaror. It stars an ensemble cast, which includes: Ramsey Nouah, AY Makun, Jim Iyke, Damilola Adegbite, Richard Mofe-Damijo,  Iretiola Doyle, Falz, Jide Kosoko, Rosaline Meurer and Nancy Isime.

Plot
The film is set in Abuja. Four rich men (the Merry Men) seduce powerful women, get contracts from the political elite, steal from the rich, give to the poor and have sex with the hottest women in town. They face their biggest challenge yet when they antagonize a notorious and corrupt politician who plans on demolishing a village to build a shopping mall. The four men scheme to save the poor people of the village.

Cast
 Ramsey Nouah as Ayo Alesinloye
 Ayo Makun as Amaju Abioritsegbemi
 Jim Iyke as Naz Okigbo 
 Folarin "Falz" Falana as Remi Martins 
 Damilola Adegbite as Dera Chukwu
 Richard Mofe-Damijo as Chief Alesinloye
 Rosaline Meurer as Kemi Alesinloye
 Ireti Doyle as Dame Maduka
 Nancy Isime as Sophie
 Lilian Esoro as Mrs Anyanwu
 Jide Kosoko as Chief Omole
 Osas Ighodaro as Chidinma (blogger)
 Francis Duru as Inspector Jack
 Ali Nuhu as Bank Client Service Head
 Faithia Balogun as Mama Abdul
 Samuel Ajibola as Abdul
 Segun Arinze as Bank IT Staff

Sequel
In 2019, Ayo Makun announced that there would be a sequel to the movie. Merry Men 2 was eventually released on 20 December 2019.

Reception
According to Nollyrated, The plot of the movie was like a basket that leaked everywhere and there were hardly any firm connections in the stories. Also, some of the characters were unnecessary to the overall story. This is nothing against the actors’ skills, but some of the characters added nothing to the story

According to Nollywood Reinvented, The best thing about this movie is the picture quality. The shots are crisp, the sets are luxurious, the aura is sold; but the action choreography is a joke, the lines fall flat, and all the impact is nonexistent. The nearly 2hr debacle is chock full with unnecessary cameos and forced insertion of party music to elevate the mood, but there’s barely any cohesion here to drive the movie along.

According to bbfc, Moderate violence includes a man gripping other men's neck, and a scene in which a man is shot, with brief sight of some bloody detail

See also 
List of Nigerian films of 2018

References

External links
 
 

2018 films
2018 action comedy films
Nigerian action comedy films
Films set in Abuja
Films shot in Abuja
Yoruba-language films
Films about corruption
Films about politicians